C.D. Real de Minas, formerly Infop RNP, was a football club located in Danlí, Honduras.

History
The club was established in 2012 as Infop RNP, the team was almost entirely formed by employees from the National Register of Persons, who decided to create an amateur team.  They later opted to enter the Major League (third division), a tournament which they eventually won in 2016, earning them the right to participate in the second division.  Still as Infop RNP, the club obtained their second major achievement in December 2017, after defeating Villanueva F.C. in the Apertura tournament of the 2017–18 Ascenso season.  Earlier that year, they participated at the 2017 Honduran Cup with great success.  In the beginning of 2018, the club unsuccessfully attempted to rename the club from Infop RNP to Tegucigalpa Fútbol Club.  In June 2018, the club gained promotion to Honduran Liga Nacional.  Prior starting playing in the 2018–19 season, the club finally decided to change their name to Club Deportivo Real de Minas and unveiled their new logo on 29 June 2018.  On 28 July 2018, Moisés López scored the historic first Liga Nacional goal for the club in the 1–3 defeat against Club Deportivo Olimpia at Estadio Roberto Martínez Ávila.

Stadium
During their journey in Liga de Ascenso, the team played their home matches at Estadio Birichiche, located a few meters south from Estadio Tiburcio Carías Andino in Tegucigalpa.  Once in Liga Nacional, they announced that they will be playing in Tegucigalpa, Danlí and Siguatepeque. After the new year in 2019, they made the Stadium in Danli their official stadium.

Current squad

League and cups performance

Achievements
Liga de Ascenso
Winners (2): 2017–18 A, 2017–18 C

References

Football clubs in Honduras
Football clubs in Tegucigalpa